= Borkhedi =

- village
- Location within Madhya Pradesh Location within India
- Coordinates: 23.2027202°N 77.2390784°E
- Country: India
- State: Madhya Pradesh
- District: Bhopal
- Tehsil: Huzur
- Elevation: 515 m (1,690 ft)

Population (2011)
  - Total: 444
- Time zone: UTC+5:30 (IST)
- ISO 3166 code: MP-IN
- 2011 census code: 482488

Borkhedi is a village in the Bhopal district of Madhya Pradesh, India. It is located in the Huzur tehsil and the Phanda block.

== Demographics ==
According to the 2011 census of India, Borkhedi has 75 households. The effective literacy rate (i.e. the literacy rate of population excluding children aged 6 and below) is 77.44%.

Demographics (2011 Census)
| | Total | Male | Female |
|---|---|---|---|
| Population | 444 | 215 | 229 |
| Children aged below 6 years | 54 | 24 | 30 |
| Scheduled caste | 24 | 12 | 12 |
| Scheduled tribe | 0 | 0 | 0 |
| Literates | 302 | 170 | 132 |
| Workers (all) | 243 | 122 | 121 |
| Main workers (total) | 209 | 109 | 100 |
| Main workers: Cultivators | 80 | 76 | 4 |
| Main workers: Agricultural labourers | 78 | 6 | 72 |
| Main workers: Household industry workers | 34 | 14 | 20 |
| Main workers: Other | 17 | 13 | 4 |
| Marginal workers (total) | 34 | 13 | 21 |
| Marginal workers: Cultivators | 0 | 0 | 0 |
| Marginal workers: Agricultural labourers | 9 | 2 | 7 |
| Marginal workers: Household industry workers | 24 | 10 | 14 |
| Marginal workers: Others | 1 | 1 | 0 |
| Non-workers | 201 | 93 | 108 |
